Alessio Tribuzzi (born 19 November 1998) is an Italian football player. He plays for  club Crotone.

Club career

Frosinone
He started playing for the Under-19 squad of Frosinone in the 2016–17 season. In August 2017 he was called up to the senior squad for the first time for a Coppa Italia match, but remained on the bench. He spent 2017–18 and 2018–19 seasons on loan to Serie D clubs Latina and Avellino respectively, achieving promotion to Serie C with Avellino.

On 11 August 2019 he made his first senior squad appearance and scored his first goal for Frosinone, establishing the final score of 4–0 in a Coppa Italia victory over Carrarese.

He made his Serie B debut for Frosinone on 24 September 2019 in a game against Perugia. He started the game and played for 79 minutes.

Crotone
On 3 August 2022, Tribuzzi signed a three-year contract with Crotone.

References

External links

 

1998 births
Footballers from Rome
Living people
Italian footballers
Association football midfielders
Frosinone Calcio players
Latina Calcio 1932 players
U.S. Avellino 1912 players
F.C. Crotone players
Serie B players
Serie D players